Ercheia pulchrivena is a species of moth of the family Erebidae first described by Francis Walker in 1864. It is found on Sumatra and Borneo.

References

External links

Moths described in 1864
Ercheiini